Events from the year 1899 in Switzerland

Events 

 1899 Swiss federal election

Establishments 

 Alliance F
 Gurten Funicular
 Monthey-Champéry-Morgins

Births 

 Charles Hug in St. Gallen

Sports 

 1899 European Figure Skating Championships
 1899 World Figure Skating Championships

References